The Grand Surprise is a French sailboat that was designed by Joubert Nivelt Design as a racer and first built in 1999.

The Grand Surprise followed the smaller  Surprise, which entered production in 1977.

Production
The design was built by Archambault Boats of Dangé-Saint-Romain and also by the BG Race shipyard in Saint-Malo in France between 1999 and 2017, with 110 boats completed, but it is now out of production. Archambault, which had been founded in 1967, went out of business in 2015. The BG Race shipyard, founded in 2013, built many designs for Archambault and went out of business in 2017.

Design
The Grand Surprise is a racing keelboat, built predominantly of fibreglass. The hull is made from single skin polyester fibreglass, while the deck is a fibreglass polyester sandwich. It has a 7/8 fractional sloop rig with aluminum spars, a keel-stepped mast, wire standing rigging and two sets of swept spreaders. The hull has a plumb stem, an open reverse transom, an internally mounted spade-type rudder controlled by a tiller and a fixed swept fin keel. It displaces  and carries  of ballast.

The boat is fitted with a Lombardini S.r.l.  diesel engine for docking and manoeuvring. The fuel tank holds .

The design has sleeping accommodation for four to six people, with a double "V"-berth in the bow cabin and two long straight settees in the main cabin. The galley is located on the port side just aft of the bow cabin. The is equipped with a single-burner stove and a sink. A navigation station is opposite the galley, on the starboard side. The head is located under the bow "V"-berth.

See also
List of sailing boat types

References

External links

Keelboats
1990s sailboat type designs
Sailing yachts
Sailboat type designs by Joubert-Nivelt
Sailboat types built by Archambault Boats
Sailboat types built by BG Race